The Jowett Bradford was a British light van produced from 1946 to 1953 by Jowett Cars Ltd of Idle, near Bradford, England. It was also available as an estate car from 1947 to 1953.

The vehicle was based on the pre-war Jowett Eight and was the first Jowett to be re-introduced after the Second World War. Although it was very basic, the Bradford's economy and availability appealed to the post-war market.

Design features
The chassis featured half-elliptic leaf springs front and rear with beam axles. The front-mounted flat-twin engine produced  and drove the rear wheels through a three-speed non-synchromesh gearbox. In 1950 the engine was updated  to give  and synchromesh was fitted to the top ratio. The  drum brakes were operated mechanically using a Girling system.

Body variants

Initially only a 10 cwt van version was made but in 1947 it was joined by an estate car, the Utility.  This was little more than the van with side windows and rear seats. By 1951 the Utility was offered in two versions: Utility and Utility De Luxe, with the latter having better trim, including a rear bumper and side footsteps. Both utilities were also offered as a '4-light van', with windows but no rear seats, to avoid the high purchase tax on private cars. The Bradford was also manufactured as a light lorry, as would later be described as a pickup truck.

Driveaway-chassis and cab-chassis versions were made for outside coachbuilders, in which form it sold in large numbers at home and abroad.

Performance
The test car cost £740 including taxes. The de-luxe specification, which included trafficators, dual windscreen wipers, running boards, a rear bumper and some chromium plating, added £38 to the total cost.

Development
A saloon and a pickup with inlet-over-exhaust cylinder heads was being developed when Jowett stopped making cars and vans.

Gallery

References

External links

Jowett Car Club Limited site
Jowett North West Section

Cars powered by boxer engines
Bradford
Cars introduced in 1946
1950s cars